A. Elizabeth "Betsy" Arnold is an American evolutionary biologist who is Professor of Plant Sciences and Curator of the Robert L. Gilbertson Mycological Herbarium at the University of Arizona. Her research considers fungal biology. She was elected Fellow of the American Association for the Advancement of Science in 2021.

Early life and education 
Arnold studied biology at Duke University. Her undergraduate thesis studied flower colour polymorphism. She moved to the University of Arizona for her doctoral studies,  where she investigated fungal endophytes under the guidance of Lucinda A. McDade. After earning her doctorate Arnold returned to Duke, where she was awarded a National Science Foundation postdoctoral fellowship to work alongside François Lutzoni.

Research and career 
In 2005, Arnold was appointed to the faculty at the University of Arizona. She was made Curator at the Robert L. Gilbertson Mycological Herbarium, and promoted to professor in 2015. Her research considers fungal endophytes, the very small fungi that live within plants without causing disease. Arnold has uncovered both the remarkable diversity of endophytes and their potential applications in biotechnology. Arnold has studied these endophytes in trees, crop plants and shrubs in tropical rainforests and the arctic tundra.

Arnold has served as an editor of Mycologia.

Awards and honors 
 2002 Alwyn Gentry Award
 2011 International Mycological Association Arthur Henry Buller Medal
 2011 David E. Cox Teaching Award
 2012 Mycological Society of America Alexopolous Prize
 2016 Mycological Society of America William H. Weston Award
 2016 University of Arizona Bart Cardon Fellow
 2021 Elected Fellow of the American Association for the Advancement of Science

Selected publications

References 

Year of birth missing (living people)
Living people
Duke University alumni
University of Arizona alumni
Evolutionary biologists
21st-century American scientists
American women scientists
21st-century American women scientists